The Speed River is a river that flows through Wellington County and the Region of Waterloo in southwestern  Ontario, Canada. It flows south from its source near Orton, through Guelph, where it is joined by the Eramosa River, then through the towns of Hespeler and Preston, finally uniting with the Grand River in north-west Cambridge.

Guelph Lake 

North of Guelph, Guelph Lake was formed as a result of the river being dammed. The dam is one of several features on the river used to prevent flooding in spring. Excess runoff is collected in the  Guelph Lake Reservoir which is drained in the previous autumn, and in summer the water is released slowly to regulate the flow of the river.

Parks and conservation areas

Guelph Lake Conservation Area is on the shore of Guelph Lake, which was formed by the damming of the Speed River. It is owned and managed by the Grand River Conservation Authority.

Riverside Park in Guelph, Ontario, is built beside the Speed River, and it is one of the oldest parks in Ontario.  It forms part of an attempted natural buffer along the Speed: "OPIRG-Guelph and other community groups have worked, in partnership with the City to rehabilitate the local river environment. Today, the river's edge is allowed to naturalize, benefiting the environment and saving maintenance. The City of Guelph's River Systems Management Plan is a positive approach to river management [whose] vision is to protect the rivers' role within the city, by featuring them in urban design, and enhancing and protecting ecological diversity, while providing beneficial uses for the community." Chemical pesticides, herbicides and fertilizers have been abandoned, in an effort of produce a narrow buffer strip within the thirty meter "riparian zone" between the rivers and their surrounding parklands, including river paths. "The buffer provides food, habitat, and a corridor for wildlife, as well as improving water quality by minimizing erosion, acting as a filter and providing shade, to lower water temperature", increasing oxygen, thus decreasing algae and bacterial contents.

In the town of Hespeler, part of Cambridge, there are several parks on the banks of the Speed River, such as Jacob's Landing, Riverside Park, Hespeler Mill Pond and Ellacott Lookout.

Chilligo Conservation Area, in Cambridge, resides at the confluence of the Speed River and Chilligo Creek. It is owned and managed by the GRCA.

The former site of Idylwild Park is on the Speed River in Cambridge. A portion, along the southern bank, is now a conservation area that is owned and managed by the GRCA.

Riverside Park, Cambridge's largest park, is on the banks of the Speed River.

Linear Park, in Cambridge, lies at the confluence of the Speed and Grand rivers.

Fishing 

There are several species of fish in the Speed River, including, smallmouth bass, largemouth bass, rainbow, brown and brook trout, northern pike, bullhead, carp and panfish. As of January 2011, efforts are being made to restore the extirpated populations of all trout species to the Speed River in Guelph. Fish impediments, such as dams, have contributed to increasing water temperature and the prevention of migration during spawning, both of which are and continue to be a reason why no trout have been caught in Guelph in decades. Guelph Lake is popular for fishing yellow perch and pike. Although the GRCA hosted ice fishing on Guelph Lake in the past, they no longer do so and the lake, along with the rest of the conservation area it is a part of, is now considered off-limits during the winter.

See also
 List of rivers of Ontario

References

External links 
 Guelph Parks

Rivers of the Regional Municipality of Waterloo
Rivers of Wellington County, Ontario
Landforms of Guelph
Tributaries of the Grand River (Ontario)